La Comédie humaine is a 2010 Hong Kong comedy film directed and written by Chan Hing-ka and Janet Chun. Released in cinemas on 8 July 2010, it premiered at the 31 March 2010 Hong Kong International Film Festival.

Plot
The story revolves around a Spring (To), a hitman from mainland China who is on a mission in Hong Kong with his partner Setting Sun (Hui). However, Spring falls ill and comes under the care of a screenwriter by the name of Soya (Wong) and they find themselves developing into a tight and everlasting friendship.

Cast
Chapman To as Spring
Wong Cho-lam as Soya
Fiona Sit as Tin-Oi
Kama Law as Maggie Chan
Benz Hui as Setting Sun
Chiu Tien-you
Lee Lik-chi

Critical reception
The film has been generally received neutrally. Chan Hing-Ka's vision was criticised for having been "poorly paced."

References

External links

La Comédie Humaine at the Hong Kong Cinemagic

2010 films
2010s Cantonese-language films
2010 comedy films
Hong Kong comedy films
2010s Hong Kong films